The Mirsad-1 (Arabic: مرصاد, English: "Observation post") is a designation for a small unmanned aerial vehicle used for reconnaissance purposes by Hezbollah group in the 2000s. Mirsad-1 drones entered Israel on two occasions, in 2004 and 2005.

The Mirsad-1 is not a Hezbollah-designed UAV. Instead, it is a name given by Hezbollah to existing Iranian UAVs provided to the group, namely the twin-tail Ababil drones. Before 2006, Hezbollah acquired up to eight such drones from Iran. Reports state that up to 30 Hezbollah personnel also received training on operating the Mirsad at the Iranian Revolutionary Guards' bases near Isfahan, Iran. Secretary-General of Hezbollah, Hassan Nasrallah, has boasted about the drones, saying that they "can be laden with a quantity of explosives of up to 40 to 50 kilograms" and can reach "deep" into Israel.

Use

The first Mirsad-1 flight into Israeli airspace occurred mid-morning on November 7, 2004. The drone flew at low level from Lebanon south over the western Galilee town of Nahariyya, then turned and flew back north, over the Mediterranean sea, having spent up to half an hour in Israeli airspace.

The second flight took place on April 11, 2005, and was a short, 18 mile incursion. The drone had crossed back into Lebanese territory by the time Israeli fighters could be scrambled to intercept.

References

Details, maps and images from the 2004 Israeli overflight

2000s military reconnaissance aircraft 
Unmanned military aircraft
Twin-boom aircraft